The 149th Massachusetts General Court, consisting of the Massachusetts Senate and the Massachusetts House of Representatives, met in 1935 and 1936 during the governorship of James Michael Curley. James G. Moran served as president of the Senate and Leverett Saltonstall served as speaker of the House.

Senators

Representatives

See also
 1936 Massachusetts gubernatorial election
 74th United States Congress
 List of Massachusetts General Courts

References

Further reading
 
 
 
 . (Related to March 1936 flood)

External links

 
 
 
 

Political history of Massachusetts
Massachusetts legislative sessions
massachusetts
1935 in Massachusetts
massachusetts
1936 in Massachusetts